The 1987 World Cup took place November 18–21 at Kapalua Resort, Bay Course, in Kapalua, Hawaii, United States. It was the 33rd World Cup event. The previous World Cup was played in 1985, since the 1986 event was cancelled. It was a stroke play team event with 32 teams. Each team consisted of two players from a country. The combined score of each team determined the team results. The Wales team of Ian Woosnam and David Llewellyn won after a sudden death playoff over the Scotland team of Sandy Lyle and Sam Torrance. It was the first playoff for the team title in the event's history. The individual competition was won by Woosnam, five strokes ahead of Lyle.

Teams 

Source:

Scores 
Team

Wales won after a sudden death playoff, with a par from each of the two players in the team, on the second extra hole.

International Trophy

Sources:

References

World Cup (men's golf)
Golf in Hawaii
World Cup
World Cup golf
World Cup golf